The Mother of All Battles Medal (Wisam 'Um Al-M’aarik) is a medal awarded by Iraq to its military personnel who served in the Persian Gulf War.

See also
Southwest Asia Service Medal, U.S. equivalent

References

Gulf War memorials
Orders, decorations, and medals of Iraq